Al-Mu'azzam or al-Muʿaẓẓam may refer to:

Al-Mu'azzam Isa, emir of Damascus as al-Mu'azzam I (1218–1227)
Al-Mu'azzam Turanshah, emir of Damascus as al-Mu'azzam II (1249–1250) and sultan of Egypt (1249–1250)

See also 
 Moazzam (Mu'azzam)